Naphtali ben David of Amsterdam was a Hebrew author. 

He was born in Witzenhausen, Germany, and belonged to the family of Moses Isserles. Naphtali was a distinguished Talmudical scholar and enjoyed great fame as a Kabbalist. He published one book, Ben David (Amsterdam, 1729), strictures on the Kabbalistic work Omer Man by Menahem Lonzano.

Publications

References
 

18th-century German male writers
18th-century German Jews
18th-century Dutch writers
Authors of Kabbalistic works
People from Witzenhausen
Writers from Amsterdam
German emigrants to the Dutch Republic